KZNG (1340 AM) is a news/talk radio station in Hot Springs, Arkansas.  It broadcasts with an ERP of 1 kW (1000 watts) from its broadcast tower near downtown Hot Springs.

KZNG is owned and operated by US Stations, LLC, a local company that also owns KLXQ, KQUS and KLAZ in Hot Springs, Arkansas and KLBL in Malvern, Arkansas. US Stations maintains studios at 125 Corporate Terrace, a building constructed for KRZB-TV (channel 26) in 1986 and expanded in 2006.

References

External links
KZNG Website
Corporate Website

ZNG